Dindori, formerly known as Ramgarh, is a district head office and a nagar panchayat in Dindori district in the state of Madhya Pradesh, India. Dindori has many historical as well as spiritual places. Some of the spiritual places are Laxman Madva, Kukarramath, Kalchuri Kali Mandir etc. Kanha Tiger Reserve is 180 km & Bandhavgarh National Park is 140 Km away from the district headquarter.

Geography
It has an average elevation of 640 metres (2,099 feet).

Demographics
 India census, Dindori had a population of 580,730. Males constitute 52% of the population and females 48%. Dindori has an average literacy rate of 71%: male literacy is 79% and, female literacy is 62%. In Dindori, 13% of the population is under 6 years of age.

Places to visit 

There are various places in and around Dindori with domestic as well as foreign tourism.

 Devnala waterfall, Dindori.
 Jagatpur trek.
 Chanda Forest village.
 Dagona waterfall.
 Nevsa waterfall ,is located 14km away.
 Karopani sanctuary etc.
 Haldi kareli at Samnapur .
 Kukrramath (ancient temple) Amarkantak road.

Transportation 

Dindori can be reached by air from Dumna airport in Jabalpur, 146 km from Dindori, by rail from Jabalpur with 146 km Pendra road with 115 km and Umaria with 108 km from Dindori, or public buses from nearby major cities of Jabalpur, Mandla, Bilaspur and Shahdol.

See also
Gadasarai

References

External links 
http://dindori.nic.in/Profile.html

Cities and towns in Dindori district